My Long Yellow Road is a (mostly) solo studio recording by jazz pianist Toshiko Akiyoshi.

Track listing
Disc 1
 "Long Yellow Road" (Akiyoshi)    
 "I Loves You Porgy" (Gershwin)    
 "No Moon at All" (Mann, Evans)    
 "Invention In 2 Voices in D Minor" (Bach)    
 "Count Your Blessings Instead Of Sheep" (Berlin)   
 "Repose" (Akiyoshi)    
 "That Old Devil Moon" (Harburg, Lane)    
 "Polka Dots and Moonbeams" (Burke, Van Heusen)    
 "Tempus Fugit" (Powell)    
Disc 2 
 "I'm Old Fashioned" (Kern, Mercer)   
 "Desert Moon" (Sasaki)    
 "It Was a Very Good Year" (Drake)    
 "Memory" (Akiyoshi)     
 "Sophisticated Lady" (Ellington, Mills, Parish)    
 "The Village" (Akiyoshi)     
 "Feast In Milano" (Akiyoshi)     
 "Hope" (Akiyoshi)     
 "Ten Ten" (Akiyoshi)

Personnel
 Toshiko Akiyoshi – piano
 Yasushi Nakamura - bass (on tracks 1-3, 1-8, 2-1, 2-2)

References / external links
 Studio Songs YZSO-10080

References

Toshiko Akiyoshi albums
2017 albums